The 1989 Asian Wrestling Championships were held in Oarai, Japan. The event took place from June 30 to July 2, 1989.

Medal table

Team ranking

Medal summary

Men's freestyle

Men's Greco-Roman

References

External links 
UWW Database

Asia
Asian Wrestling Championships
W
2013 Asian Wrestling